Inge is a given name in various Germanic language-speaking cultures. In Swedish and Norwegian, it is mostly used as a masculine, but less often also as a feminine name, sometimes as a short form of Ingeborg, while in Danish, Estonian, Frisian, German and Dutch it is exclusively feminine. The feminine name has the variant Inga.

The name is in origin a hypocorism of names beginning in the element Ing- (such as  Ingar, Inger, Ingrid, Ingeborg, Ingram, Ingvild, Ingunn etc.). These Germanic names made reference to either the god Ing or to the tribe of the Ingvaeones (who were presumably in turn named for the god).

Inge is also encountered as a surname in the English-speaking world; the surname is usually pronounced in England to rhyme with "ring"; alternatively (especially in the United States) some families pronounce it to rhyme with "hinge."

People called Inge

Masculine given name

Scandinavian royalty
Inge the Elder (died c. 1110)
Inge the Younger, king of Sweden c. 1110–1125
Inge I of Norway (died 1161)
Inge Magnusson (died 1202), pretender to the Norwegian throne
Inge II of Norway (died 1217)

Modern
Inge Danielsson (1941–2021), Swedish footballer
Inge Edler (1911–2001), Swedish cardiologist
Inge Ejderstedt (born 1946), Swedish footballer
Inge Hammarström (born 1948), Swedish ice hockey player
Inge Hansen (born 1946), Norwegian handball player
Inge Krokann (1893–1962), Norwegian writer
Inge Lønning (1938–2013), Norwegian theologian and politician
Inge Steensland (1923–2010), Norwegian resistance member
Inge Thulin (born 1953), Swedish chief executive
Inge Thun (1945–2008), Norwegian football goalkeeper
 Kjell Inge Røkke (born 1958), Norwegian businessman
 Stig Inge Bjørnebye (born 1969), Norwegian footballer

Feminine given name
Inge Bauer (born 1940), East German pentathlete
Inge Bödding (born 1947), West German middle distance runner
Inge Borkh (1921–2018), German soprano
Inge Brück (born 1936), German singer and actress
Inge de Bruijn (born 1973), Dutch swimmer
Inge Dekker (born 1985), Dutch swimmer
Inge Deutschkron (1922–2022), German-Israeli journalist and author 
Inge Eriksen (1935–2015), Danish writer and political activist
Inge Faes (born 1973), Belgian politician
Inge Feltrinelli (1930–2018), German-born Italian photographer and director
Inge Garstedt (born 1947), Swedish politician
Inge Genefke (born 1938), Danish torture victim activist
Inge Görmer (born 1934), East German speed skater
Inge Gräßle (born 1961), German politician and MEP
Inge Helten (born 1950), West German sprinter
Inge Heybroek (1915–1956), Dutch field hockey player
Inge Hornstra (born 1974), Dutch-born Australian television and stage actress
Inge Höger (born 1950), German politician
Inge Janssen (born 1989). Dutch rower
Inge Keller (1923–2017), German actress
Inge Kilian (born 1935), German high jumper
Inge King (1915–2016), German-born Australian sculptor
Inge Koch (figure skater) (born 1910s), German figure skater
Inge Lange (1927–2013), East German politician
Inge Lehmann (1888–1993), Danish seismologist
Inge Meysel (1910–2004), German actress
Inge Morath (1923–2002), Austrian-born American photographer
Inge Müller (1925–1966), East German author
Inge Scholl (1917–1998), German resistance member
Inge Sørensen (1924–2011), Danish swimmer
Inge Stoll (1930–1958), German motorcycle racer
Inge Vermeulen (1985–2015), Brazilian-born Dutch field hockey player
Inge Vervotte (born 1977), Belgian government minister
Inge Viermetz (1908–1997), German Nazi official
Inge von Wangenheim (1912–1993), German actress, writer and communist
Inge Wersin-Lantschner (1905–1997), Austrian alpine skier

Surname
 Peter Inge, Baron Inge (1935–2022), British soldier; Baron Inge, KG, GCB, PC, DL, former chief of the UK Defence Staff
 Brandon Inge (born 1977), American athlete (baseball), Detroit Tigers third baseman (1998–2012)
 M. Thomas Inge (1936–2021), American author
 Samuel Williams Inge (1817–1868), U.S. Congressman
 William Inge (disambiguation), several people known by that name, including the 20th-century American playwright

See also
 Yngve

References

Scandinavian masculine given names
Dutch feminine given names
Estonian feminine given names
German feminine given names
Norwegian masculine given names
Swedish masculine given names
Hypocorisms